Paliy or Palii is a Ukrainian surname. It may refer to:
 Andrei Palii (1940–2021), Moldovan agronomist
 Andrei Paliy (1971–2022), Russian naval officer
 Efimie Palii, Moldovan politician
 Ihor Paliy (born 1963), Ukrainian painter
 Ion Palii, Moldovan politician
 Semen Paliy (c. 1645 – 1710), Ukrainian Cossack
 Paliy uprising, a Cossack uprising led by Semen Paliy

See also
 
 

Ukrainian-language surnames